The Tupolev Tu-154 (NATO reporting name: "Careless") is a three-engined, medium-range, narrow-body airliner designed in the mid-1960s and manufactured by Tupolev. A workhorse of Soviet and (subsequently) Russian airlines for several decades, it carried half of all passengers flown by Aeroflot and its subsidiaries (137.5 million/year or 243.8 billion passenger-km in 1990), remaining the standard domestic-route airliner of Russia and former Soviet states until the mid-2000s. It was exported to 17 non-Russian airlines and used as a head-of-state transport by the air forces of several countries.

Capable of operating from unpaved and gravel airfields with only basic facilities, it was widely used in the extreme Arctic conditions of Russia's northern/eastern regions, where other airliners were unable to operate. Originally designed for a 45,000-hour service life (18,000 cycles), but capable of 80,000 hours with upgrades, it was expected to continue in service until 2016, although noise regulations have restricted flights to Western Europe and other regions.

Development

The Tu-154 was developed to meet Aeroflot's requirement to replace the jet-powered Tu-104 and the Antonov An-10 and Ilyushin Il-18 turboprops. Conceptually similar to the British Hawker Siddeley Trident, which first flew in 1962, and the American Boeing 727, which first flew in 1963, the medium-range Tu-154 was marketed by Tupolev at the same time as Ilyushin was marketing the long-range Ilyushin Il-62. The Soviet Ministry of Aircraft Industry chose the Tu-154, as it incorporated the latest in Soviet aircraft design and best met Aeroflot's anticipated requirements for the 1970s and 1980s.

The Tu-154 first flew on 4 October 1968. The first deliveries to Aeroflot were in 1970 with freight (mail) services beginning in May 1971 and passenger services in February 1972. Limited production of the 154M model was still occurring as of January 2009, despite previous announcements of the end of production in 2006. 1025 Tu-154s have been built, 214 of which were still in service as of 14 December 2009. The last serial Tu-154 was delivered to the Russian Defense Ministry on 19 February 2013 from the Aviakor factory, equipped with upgraded avionics, a VIP interior and a communications suite. The factory has four unfinished airframes in its inventory which can be completed if new orders are received.

Design

The Tu-154 is powered by three rear-mounted, low-bypass turbofan engines arranged similarly to those of the Boeing 727, but it is slightly larger than its American counterpart. Both the 727 and the Tu-154 use an S-duct for the middle (number-two) engine. The original model was equipped with Kuznetsov NK-8-2 engines, which were replaced with Soloviev D-30KU-154 in the Tu-154M. All Tu-154 aircraft models have a relatively high thrust-to-weight ratio, giving the type excellent performance, though at the expense of lower fuel efficiency. This became an important factor in later decades as fuel costs grew.

The cockpit is fitted with conventional dual yoke control columns. Flight control surfaces are hydraulically operated.

The cabin of the Tu-154, although of the same six-abreast seating layout, gives the impression of an oval interior, with a lower ceiling than is common on Boeing and Airbus airliners. The passenger cabin accommodates 128 passengers in a two-class layout and 164 passengers in single-class layout, and up to 180 passengers in high-density layout. The layout can be modified to what is called a winter version where some seats are taken out and a wardrobe is installed for passenger coats. The passenger doors are smaller than on its Boeing and Airbus counterparts. Luggage space in the overhead compartments is very limited.

Like the Tupolev Tu-134, the Tu-154 has a wing swept back at 35° at the quarter-chord line. The British Hawker Siddeley Trident has the same sweepback angle, while the Boeing 727 has a slightly smaller sweepback angle of 32°. The wing also has anhedral (downward sweep) which is a distinguishing feature of Russian low-wing airliners designed during this era. Most Western low-wing airliners such as the contemporary Boeing 727 have dihedral (upward sweep). The anhedral means that Russian airliners have poor lateral stability compared to their Western counterparts, but also are more resistant to Dutch roll tendencies.

Considerably heavier than its predecessor Soviet-built airliner the Ilyushin Il-18, the Tu-154 was equipped with an oversized landing gear to reduce ground load, enabling it to operate from the same runways. The aircraft has two six-wheel main bogies fitted with large, low-pressure tires that retract into pods extending from the trailing edges of the wings (a common Tupolev feature), plus a two-wheel nosegear unit. Soft oleo struts (shock absorbers) provide a much smoother ride on bumpy airfields than most airliners, which very rarely operate on such poor surfaces.

The original requirement was to have a three-person flight crew – captain, first officer, and flight engineer – as opposed to a four- or five-person crew, as on other Soviet airliners. It became evident that a fourth crew member, a navigator, was still needed, and a seat was added on production aircraft, although their workstation was compromised due to the limitations of the original design. Navigators are no longer trained, and this profession is becoming obsolete with the retirement of the oldest Soviet-era planes.

The latest variant (Tu-154M-100, introduced 1998) includes an NVU-B3 Doppler navigation system, a triple autopilot, which provides an automatic ILS approach according to ICAO category II weather minima, an autothrottle, a Doppler drift and speed measure system (DISS), and a "Kurs-MP" radio navigation suite. A stability and control augmentation system improves handling characteristics during manual flight. Modern upgrades normally include modernised TCAS, GPS, and other systems (mostly American-made or EU-made).

Early versions of the Tu-154 cannot be modified to meet the current Stage III noise regulations, so are no longer allowed to fly into airspace where such regulations are enforced, such as the European Union. However, the Tu-154M's D-30 engines can be fitted with hush kits, allowing them to meet noise regulations.

Variants

Many variants of this airliner have been built. Like its Western counterpart, the 727, many of the Tu-154s in service have been hush-kitted, and some converted to freighters.

 Tu-154
 Tu-154 production started in 1970, and the first passenger flight was performed on 9 February 1972. Powered by Kuznetsov NK-8-2 turbofans, it carried 164 passengers. About 42 were built.

 Tu-154A
 The first upgraded version of the original Tu-154, the A model, in production since 1974, added center-section fuel tanks and more emergency exits, while engines were upgraded to higher-thrust Kuznetsov NK-8-2U. Other upgrades include automatic flaps/slats and stabilizer controls and modified avionics. Max. takeoff weight – . There were 15 different interior layouts for the different domestic and international customers, seating between 144 and 152 passengers. To discern the A model from the base model note the spike at the junction of the fin and tail. This is a fat bullet on the A model, and a slender spike on the base model.

 Tu-154B
 As the original Tu-154 and Tu-154A suffered wing cracks after a few years in service, a version with a new, stronger wing, designated Tu-154B, went into production in 1975. It also had an additional fuselage fuel tank, additional emergency exits in the tail. Important to Aeroflot was the increased passenger capacity, hence lower operating costs. With the NK-8-2U engines the only way to improve the economics of the airplane was to spread costs across more seats. The autopilot was certified for ICAO Category II automatic approaches. Most previously built Tu-154 and Tu-154A were also modified into this variant, with the replacement of the wing.

 Tu-154B-1
 Aeroflot wanted this version for increased revenue on domestic routes. It carried 160 passengers. This version also had some minor modifications to the fuel system, avionics, air conditioning, and landing gear. 64 were built from 1977 to 1978.

 Tu-154B-2
 A minor modernization of Tu-154B-1. The airplane was designed to be converted from the 160 passenger version to a 180 passenger version by removing the galley. The procedure took about  hours. Some of the earlier Tu-154Bs were modified to that standard. Some 311 aircraft were built, including VIP versions. A few remain in service.

 Tu-154S
 The Tu-154S is an all-cargo or freighter version of the Tu-154B, using a strengthened floor, and adding a forward cargo door on the port side of the fuselage. The aircraft could carry nine Soviet PAV-3 pallets. Maximum payload – . There were plans for 20 aircraft, but only nine were converted, two from Tu-154 models and seven from Tu-154B models. Trials were held in the early 1980s and the aircraft was authorized regular operations in 1984. By 1997 all had been retired.

 Tu-154M
 The Tu-154M and Tu-154M Lux are the most highly upgraded versions, which first flew in 1982 and entered mass production in 1984. It uses more fuel-efficient Soloviev D-30KU-154 turbofans. Together with significant aerodynamic refinement, this led to much lower fuel consumption hence longer range, as well as lower operating costs. The aircraft has new double-slotted (instead of triple-slotted) flaps, with an extra 36-degree position (in addition to existing 15, 28 and 45-degree positions on older versions), which allows reduction of noise on approach. It also has a relocated auxiliary power unit and numerous other improvements. About 320 were manufactured. Mass production ended in 2006, though limited manufacturing continued as of January 2009. No new airframes have been built since the early 1990s, and production since then involved assembling aircraft from components on hand. Chinese Tu-154MD electronic intelligence aircraft carry a large-size synthetic-aperture radar (SAR) under their mainframe.

 Tu-154M-LK-1
 Cosmonaut trainer. This was a salon VIP aircraft modified to train cosmonauts to fly the Buran reusable spacecraft, the Soviet equivalent of the US Space Shuttle. The Tu-154 was used because the Buran required a steep descent, which the Tu-154 was capable of replicating. The cabin featured trainee workstations, one of which was identical to the Buran's flightdeck. The forward baggage compartment was converted into a camera bay, as the aircraft was used to train cosmonauts in observation and photographic techniques.

 Tu-154M-ON monitoring aircraft
 Germany modified one of the Tu-154s it inherited from the former East German Air Force into an observation airplane. This aircraft was involved with the Open Skies inspection flights. It was converted at the Elbe Aircraft Plant (Elbe Flugzeugwerke) in Dresden, and flew in 1996. After 24 monitoring missions, it was lost in a mid-air collision in 1997.

 The Russians also converted a Tu-154M to serve as an Open Skies monitoring aircraft. They used the Tu-154M-LK-1, and converted it to a Tu-154M-ON. When not flying over North America, it is used to ferry cosmonauts. China is believed  to have converted one Tu-154 to an electronic countermeasures aircraft.

 Tu-154M-100
 Design of this variant started in 1994, but the first aircraft were not delivered until 1998. It is an upgraded version with Western avionics, including the Flight Management Computer, GPS, EGPWS, TCAS, and other modern systems. The airplane could carry up to 157 passengers. The cabin featured an automatic oxygen system and larger overhead bins. Three were produced, as payment of debts owed by Russia to Slovakia. Three aircraft were delivered in 1998 to Slovak Airlines, and sold back to Russia in 2003.
 Tu-155
 A Tu-154 converted into a testbed for alternative fuels. It first flew in 1988 and was used until the fall of the Soviet Union, when it was placed in storage.

 Tu-164
 Initial designation of the Tu-154M.

 Tu-174
 Proposed stretched version of Tu-154.

 Tu-194
 Proposed shortened version of Tu-154.

Operators

Current operators

As of August 2017, there were 44 Tupolev Tu-154 aircraft of all variants still in civil, governmental or military service. 

A 45th aircraft has been sighted flying with Air Kyrgyzstan in 2017, but is not listed by the airline as part of its fleet.

A 46th aircraft, a Polish Tu-154 with operational number 102, is currently in storage at the military airport in Mińsk Mazowiecki. It was operated by 36th Special Aviation Regiment, but after the 2010 Polish Air Force Tu-154 crash of the Tu-154 101, the Regiment has been disbanded and the plane was grounded. It was fully operational, but the government decided not to use or sell it until the investigation into the Smoleńsk crash is finished. As of June 2021 the aircraft is not flying, and it is unlikely to come back into service, since the government operates a fleet of brand-new, more fuel-efficient jets like the Gulfstream G550 and the Boeing 737 NG. In 2020 it was revealed by the investigation team, led by Antoni Macierewicz, that the aircraft was structurally damaged. The access to the aircraft was restricted by the general prosecutor, and entering its hangar requires a special permission.

As of June 2015, the remaining operators are:

Operational history
In January 2010 Russian flag carrier Aeroflot announced the retirement of its Tu-154 fleet after 40 years, with the last scheduled flight being Aeroflot Flight 736 from Yekaterinburg to Moscow on 31 December 2009. In December 2010, Uzbekistan Airways also declared that it was retiring its Tu-154s. In February 2011, all remaining Iranian Tu-154s were grounded after two incidents. 

On 27 December 2016, the Russian Ministry of Defence announced that it had grounded all of its Tu-154s until the end of the investigation into the December 2016 crash of a 1983 Tupolev Tu-154. This was followed by the grounding of all Tu-154s in Russia. The Tu-154 had crashed into the Black Sea just after takeoff from Sochi, Russia, on 25 December 2016 killing all 92 people on board, including 64 members of the Alexandrov Ensemble, an official army choir of the Russian Armed Forces.

In October 2020 ALROSA, the last Russian passenger airline to operate this aircraft, retired its last remaining Tu-154.

Former operators

Former civil operators

Former military operators

Incidents and accidents
Between 1970 and December 2016 there were 110 serious incidents involving the Tu-154, including 73 hull losses, with 2,911 fatalities. Of the fatal incidents, five resulted from terrorist or military terrorist action (two other wartime losses were non-fatal), several from poor runway conditions in winter (including one in which the airplane struck snow plows on the runway), cargo overloading in the lapse of post-Soviet federal safety standards, and mid-air collisions due to faulty air traffic control. Other incidents resulted from mechanical problems, running out of fuel on unscheduled routes, pilot errors (including inadequate flight training for new crews), and cargo fires; several accidents remain unexplained.

On 2 January 2011, Russia's Federal Transport Oversight Agency advised airlines to stop using remaining examples of the Tu-154 (B variant) until the fatal fire incident in Surgut had been investigated. Its operation in Iran ceased in February 2011 due to a number of crashes and incidents involving the type (almost 9% of all Tu-154 losses have occurred in Iran). This grounding compounded the effects of US embargo on civil aircraft parts, substantially decreasing the number of airworthy aircraft in the Iranian civil fleet. In 2010 there were two fatal losses of the Tu-154 due to pilot error and/or weather conditions (a Polish presidential jet attempting a rural airfield landing in heavy fog, the 2010 Polish Air Force Tu-154 crash, and a Russian-registered plane that suffered engine stall after a crew member accidentally de-activated a fuel transfer pump). Following these accidents, in March 2011 the Russian Federal Bureau of Aviation recommended a withdrawal of remaining Tu-154Ms from service.

On 27 December 2016, the Russian Defence Ministry grounded all Tu-154s in Russia pending investigation into the 25 December 2016 Tupolev Tu-154 crash which killed 64 members of the Alexandrov Ensemble, an official Red Army Choir of the Russian Armed Forces.

List

Aircraft on display

 СССР-85020 at the Ukraine State Aviation Museum.
 EW-85581 in the grounds of Minsk National Airport in Belarus.
 HA-LCG at the Aeropark museum in Budapest.
 HA-LCA at Budapest Ferenc Liszt International Airport
 LZ-BTU at the Aviomuseum Burgas museum in Burgas, Bulgaria.
OK-BYZ at the Aviation Museum Kunovice, Czech Republic
OM-BYO at the Museum of Aviation in Košice, Slovakia

Specifications

In popular culture
 Tu-154 is the most popular airliner appearing in many Soviet and Russian films.
 Air Crew is the 1979 action film revolving around the exploits of a Soviet Tu-154 crew on an international flight, the first Soviet film in the disaster genre.

See also

References

Citations

Bibliography
 Dmitriy Komissarov, Tupolev Tu-154, The USSR's Medium-Range Jet Airliner, (Hinckley, UK, 2007) 
 Yefin Gordon and Vladimir Rigmant, OKB Tupolev, A History of the Design Bureau and its Aircraft, translated by Alexander Boyd, edited by Dmitriy Komissarov (Hinckley, UK, 2005)

External links
 
 Image of Tu-154M flight-deck
 BBC: Tu-154: The backbone of Russian fleets
 Gallery of Polish VIP variant of Tu-154M used by 36. Special Transport Aviation Regiment in Plastikowe.pl magazine

Tu-154
1960s Soviet airliners
Trijets
Low-wing aircraft
T-tail aircraft
Aircraft first flown in 1968